Marks Munyai (born 27 May 1991) is a South African soccer player who plays as a midfielder for South African Premier Division side TS Galaxy. He was born in Masakona in Venda, now part of modern day. Limpopo.

References

Living people
1991 births
South African soccer players
People from Makhado Local Municipality
Sportspeople from Limpopo
Association football midfielders
Black Leopards F.C. players
Highlands Park F.C. players
TS Galaxy F.C. players
South African Premier Division players
National First Division players